Moračnik may refer to:
 Moračnik Monastery 
 Moračnik (island), in Lake Skadar in the municipality of Bar in Montenegro